Yashodhara Higher Secondary School is a higher secondary school in the eastern hilly region of Nepal. It is in a small town of Taksar, Bhojpur. It was named after Yashodhara, the wife of Siddhartha Gautama, who later became Gautama Buddha, the primary figure of the Buddhist religion. The school was established in year 1974. It is a public school run by the Nepal government.

The school lies on the lap of a small hill covered with forest called Raniban. There are three big taps of naturally flowing spring water. This water is the source of drinking water to the students of the school and the locals around the school. There is a public library in the northern side of the school.

The school lies at about a half-hour walking distance from Bhojpur, the district headquarters.

External links 

 http://www.yashodhara.edu.np/
 http://www.schoolmates.com.np/school_info.jsp?school_id=S0235

Secondary schools in Nepal

Educational institutions established in 1974
1974 establishments in Nepal
Buildings and structures in Bhojpur District, Nepal